Greg Berry (born 5 March 1971) is an English retired footballer who played as a winger. He is the head coach and technical director at Peace Arch Soccer Club and is also coaching at Coastal WFC in British Columbia, Canada.

References

Since 1888... The Searchable Premiership and Football League Player Database (subscription required)

1971 births
Living people
English footballers
Association football midfielders
Premier League players
Leyton Orient F.C. players
Wimbledon F.C. players
Millwall F.C. players
Brighton & Hove Albion F.C. players
East Thurrock United F.C. players
People from Grays, Essex
People from Thurrock
Sportspeople from Essex
Thurrock F.C. players